Sabrina Starke (born August 9, 1979, Paramaribo, Suriname) is a Surinamese-Dutch singer/songwriter from Rotterdam, Netherlands. Her style is a mix of soul, folk, R&B and jazz.

Career

Her debut album Yellow Brick Road was released on October 1, 2008. It was produced and recorded in Los Angeles, California by Dutch producers Beat Royalty (Chris Kooreman and Edo Plasschaert) and mixed in Burbank, California by Brad Gilderman.

The first single from the album, "Do for Love" was not only a hit song in the Netherlands but also became very popular in France as the theme tune of the TV show Fortune.

On October 27, 2008, Starke signed with Blue Note, which re-released Yellow Brick Road. On March 9, the album went gold in the Netherlands.

She has won the 2008 Edison Award Best Newcomer.

Discography

Albums
 2008: Yellow Brick Road
 2010: Bags & Suitcases
 2012: Outside the Box
 2013: Lean on Me (8ball Music)
 2015: Sabrina Starke (Zip)
 2018: Underneath the Surface

Singles

Awards

References

External links
 Sabrina Starke's official website
 Sabrina Starke's official page at Myspace
 Sabrina Starke's breakthrough performance on Dutch national television

1979 births
Living people
Dutch soul singers
Surinamese emigrants to the Netherlands
People from Paramaribo
Musicians from Rotterdam
21st-century Dutch singers
21st-century Dutch women singers